The High Court with Doug Benson was an American comedy and arbitration-based reality court show presided over by comedian Doug Benson. The High Court with Doug Benson premiered on Comedy Central on February 28, 2017. In each episode Benson judged real cases while under the influence of cannabis. This court show also marked the return of Viacom to the court show genre.

Development
While pitching the show to Comedy Central, Doug Benson said that the show would be a "court room show and I'm the judge". Comedy Central accepted it right away, thinking that Benson's antics would be liked by their audience. Benson said the pitch was easiest pitch he had ever made in his career.

Production
Benson was under the influence of cannabis during each trial. Each episode had a special "guest bailiff", who helped make the final decision on the case during the deliberation, often after smoking from a bong on-air along with Benson. All of the cases featured were real and Benson's rulings were real and legally binding. The cases in the show were pulled from the Los Angeles County court records, which is a common practice used in other court shows. The show's budget had money allotted for Benson to pay the people pleading their cases if necessary.

The show was recorded in Los Angeles, California, where recreational use of cannabis has been legal since 2016. A special ventilation system was added to the deliberation room studio to filter smoke out of the room, so production crew and producers would not be impaired during filming.

The series was directed by Sharon Everitt, and produced by JASH and Propagate Content.

Episodes

Home media
The High Court with Doug Benson is available in high-definition and standard-definition video for digital purchase on Google Play, Amazon Video, and on Microsoft.

References

External links
 
 

2010s American late-night television series
2017 American television series debuts
2017 American television series endings
American television series about cannabis
Court shows
English-language television shows
Comedy Central late-night programming
Television shows filmed in California
2010s American reality television series
2010s American legal television series
Arbitration courts and tribunals
Cannabis in California
Comedy Central original programming